Peter K. Schuster (born 7 March 1941) is a theoretical chemist known for his work with the German Nobel Laureate Manfred Eigen in developing the quasispecies model. His work has made great strides in the understanding of viruses and their replication, as well as theoretical mechanisms in the origin of life.

Biography
Schuster was born in Vienna, Austria and graduated with highest honors from "gymnasium". He studied chemistry and physics at the University of Vienna and earned his PhD in 1967. He was a Postdoc at the Max Planck Institute for Biophysical Chemistry. Together with Eigen, Schuster developed the quasispecies model.
He is full professor of theoretical chemistry at the University of Vienna, the founding director of the Institute of Molecular Biotechnology in Jena, Germany, as well as the current head of its Department of Molecular Evolutionary Biology. He is an external faculty member at the Santa Fe Institute. Currently, Prof. Schuster is the President of the Austrian Academy of Sciences.

Honours and awards
 1971: Theodor Körner promotion price
 1971: Jubilee Award of the Chemical-Physical Society
 1983: Erwin Schrödinger Prize of the Austrian Academy of Sciences
 1989: Dr. Asen Zlatarov price of the Bulgarian Academy of Sciences
 1993: Austrian Decoration for Science and Art
 1993: Member of the German Academy of Sciences Leopoldina
 1995: Philip Morris Research Prize
 1995: Josef Loschmidt Medal of the Austrian Chemical Society
 1997: City of Vienna Prize for Science
 1997: Cardinal Innitzer Prize for Science
 1999: Wilhelm Exner Medal of the Austrian Trade Association.
 2010: Great Silver Medal for Service to the City of Vienna

See also
 What is Life? (Schrödinger)

References

External links 
 Schuster's personal homepage at the University of Vienna
 Curriculum vitae
 Interview regarding Cardinal Schönborn's statement on evolution
 Schuster's Profile from Santa Fe Institute

1941 births
Living people
20th-century Austrian people
21st-century Austrian people
20th-century biologists
21st-century biologists
Austrian agnostics
Theoretical biologists
Austrian biologists
Scientists from Vienna
Recipients of the Austrian Decoration for Science and Art
Members of the Austrian Academy of Sciences
Members of the European Academy of Sciences and Arts
Foreign associates of the National Academy of Sciences
Santa Fe Institute people
Members of the German Academy of Sciences Leopoldina